Channel Zero can refer to:
Channel Zero (video encoding), a multi-camera, split-screen encoding method
Channel Zero (company), a Toronto-based broadcasting company
Channel Zero (band), a Belgian heavy metal band
Channel Zero (comics), a comic book by Brian Wood
Channel Zero (TV series), a horror anthology television series
"She Watch Channel Zero?!", a song by the band Public Enemy

Channel 0 can refer to:
ATV (Australia), a Melbourne television station previously known as "ATV-0"
TVQ, a Brisbane television station previously known as "TVQ-0"
RTQ, a Toowoomba television station previously known as "DDQ-0"
Special Broadcasting Service, an Australian public broadcasting radio and television network previously known as "Channel 0/28"